Didac Salas Planas (born 19 May 1993) is a Spanish athlete specialising in the pole vault. He won the gold medal at the 2010 Summer Youth Olympics.

His personal bests in the event are 5.60 metres outdoors (Palafrugell 2014) and 5.60 metres indoors (Prague 2015).

Competition record

1No mark in the final

References

 

1993 births
Living people
Spanish male pole vaulters
Athletes from Catalonia
People from Vallès Occidental
Sportspeople from the Province of Barcelona
Athletes (track and field) at the 2010 Summer Youth Olympics
Youth Olympic gold medalists for Spain
Youth Olympic gold medalists in athletics (track and field)